Abraham Hoffman (אברהם הופמן; October 2, 1938 - April 26, 2015) was an Israeli former basketball player. He played the forward position.  He played in the Israel Basketball Premier League, and for the Israeli national basketball team.

Biography
Hoffman was born and raised in Jerusalem, Land of Israel, and was 1.90 m (6 ft 3 in) tall. He played 13 seasons in the Israel Basketball Premier League from 1955 to 1968, for Maccabi Jerusalem and Maccabi Tel Aviv.

Hoffman also played for the Israeli national basketball team. He competed in the 1961 European Championship for Men, 1963 European Championship for Men, 1965 European Championship for Men, and 1967 European Championship for Men.

He died at 76 years of age, and was buried in Jerusalem.

References 

Israeli men's basketball players
Maccabi Tel Aviv B.C. players
Israeli Basketball Premier League players
Sportspeople from Jerusalem
1938 births
2015 deaths